The 2015 College Basketball Invitational (CBI) was a single-elimination tournament of 16 NCAA Division I teams that did not participate in the NCAA tournament or the NIT. The opening games and the quarterfinals were held in mid-March on the home courts of participating teams. After the quarterfinals, the bracket were reseeded. A best-of-three championship series between the two finalist teams was held, with Loyola-Chicago winning the title with a two-game sweep. One change from this year's CBI Tournament was the use of a 30-second shot clock (instead of a 35-second clock).

Participants
The following teams were announced as participants Sunday, March 15 after the NCAA Selection Show.

Declined invitations 
The following programs declined to participate in the 2015 CBI:

 California
 Florida
 Florida State
 Indiana
 Kansas State
 Memphis
 Minnesota
 Northwestern
 Oregon State
 Penn State
 Pittsburgh
 South Carolina
 TCU
 Tennessee

Schedule
Source:

Bracket

Home teams listed second.

References

College Basketball Invitational
College Basketball Invitational